Clodoaldo Paulino de Lima, or simply Clodoaldo (born November 25, 1978, in Paulínia), is a Brazilian striker with Depor FC.

He played in Colombia from 2002 to 2003. In 2004, he was a member of the  Corinthians team that was relegated to Serie B, scoring in their final match against Gremio.

In May 2009 he left Santo Andre for Figueirense Futebol Clube.

As of March 2012 he was playing for Uberaba.

In January 2013 he signed for Cruzeiro-RS, having played in friendly matches for União Suzano (Usac) in Bolivia towards the end of 2012.

In January 2014 he joined Depor FC from Brazilian side Suzano.

References

External links
 

1978 births
Living people
Brazilian footballers
Association football forwards
Independiente Medellín footballers
Sociedade Esportiva e Recreativa Caxias do Sul players
Clube do Remo players
Criciúma Esporte Clube players
Sport Club Corinthians Paulista players
Pohang Steelers players
K League 1 players
Esporte Clube Cruzeiro players
Esporte Clube Santo André players
Clube Náutico Capibaribe players
G.D. Estoril Praia players
Guaratinguetá Futebol players
Uberaba Sport Club players
Figueirense FC players
Campeonato Brasileiro Série C players
Expatriate footballers in Colombia
Expatriate footballers in South Korea
Expatriate footballers in Portugal
Brazilian expatriate footballers
Brazilian expatriate sportspeople in South Korea
Brazilian expatriate sportspeople in Portugal
Footballers from São Paulo (state)